ICOS ligand (ICOSLG, ICOSL or GL50) is a protein that in humans is encoded by the ICOSLG gene located at chromosome 21. ICOSLG has also been designated as CD275 (cluster of differentiation 275).

ICOSLG is glycosylated transmembrane structure, which is classified as a member of the B7 family due to the significant homology with B7 family members. The B7/CD28 superfamily provides both positive and negative co-signals to immunocytes in immune responses.

The interaction of ICOSLG with ICOS, the specific receptor for ICOSLG, is critically involved in the activation, proliferation, differentiation and cytokine production of T cells as well as in the antibody secretion from B cells during secondary immune responses.

ICOSLG, which is extensively expressed in both non-lymphatic and lymphatic tissues, is an important molecule in upregulating and promoting T cell immune responses. Expression of ICOSLG in naive B cells and monocytes in PBMCs is at a low level. After stimulation by IFN-γ, TNF-α, or LPS, it can be quickly up-regulated. The induced expression of ICOS on activated T cells mainly regulates the secretion of Th2 cytokines and thus shifts the immune response to the Th2 type. It has been reported that the ICOS/ICOSLG pathway is involved in immunopathogenesis such as infection, hypersensitivity, autoimmune diseases, transplantation immunity and tumor immunity.

ICOSLG is also a major costimulator in endothelial cell-mediated T cell activation. It has an important physiological role of ICOSLG in the reactivation of effector/memory T cells on the endothelium controlling the entry of immune cells into inflamed tissue.

Structure 
Inducible costimulator-ligand (ICOS-L) is a member of the B7 family of costimulatory ligands sharing 19–20% sequence identity with CD80 and CD86. Two splice variants of human ICOSLG have been described and designated hICOSLG and B7-H2/B7RP-1/hLICOS.

Both molecules have an identical extracellular domain but differ at the carboxyl-terminal end of their cytoplasmic regions. In humans, cell surface expression of ICOSLG has been described on B cells, dendritic cells, monocytes/macrophages, and T cells. In addition, mRNA expression of ICOSLG has been detected in a variety of lymphoid and nonlymphoid organs, with hICOSLG showing a more lymphoid-restricted expression pattern (spleen, lymph node), whereas B7-H2/B7RP-1/hLICOSmRNA was expressed in all organs examined (e.g., spleen, kidney, heart, and brain).

Interaction 
Murine ICOSLG, unlike CD80 and CD86, does not interact with CD28 or CTLA-4 (CD152). Instead, ICOSLG binds to ICOS, a T cell-specific costimulatory molecule homologous to CD28 and CTLA-4. In humans, ICOSLG binds to ICOS but also to CD28 and CTLA-4.

The strong impact of ICOS/ICOSLG interaction on T cell-mediated immune responses in vivo became evident by the disruption of the ICOS gene in mice. ICOS deficient mice are characterized by impaired germinal center formation, have a profound defect in isotype class switching in T cell-dependent B cell responses, and are defective in IL-4 and IL-13 production. In addition, blockade of ICOS/ICOSLG interaction in animal models of experimental allergic encephalomyelitis and of cardiac allograft rejection revealed a critical role of ICOS and its ligand in inflammatory immune reactions.

Immunodeficiencies 
The research with mutant ICOSLG showed that if the protein was retained in ER/GA, instead of the cell surface in normal case, it diminished B cell costimulation of T cells. It led to defect in antibody and memory B cell generation. Mutant ICOSLG also impaired migration of lymphocytes and neuthrophils across endothelial cells, which normally express ICOSLG. These defects contributed with altered adaptive immunity and neutropenia in patient, thus showing ICOSLG deficiency as a cause of combined immunodeficiency.

Immunotherapy 
The fluctuant balance between co-stimulatory and coinhibitory signals that a T cell receives participates in the initiation, effection, and termination of an immune response. Excessive activation and immune reaction of T cells may result in autoimmune diseases and host immune injury.

ICOSLG delivers a potent co-stimulatory signal to T cells when engaged by ICOS, resulting in T cell activation and proliferation. The existence of ICOS/ICOSLG signal in vivo is closely associated with many mouse autoimmune disease models. Conversely, the absence of ICOS/ICOSLG signal may be a good way to relieve autoimmune disease. In view of its critical function in regulating immunohomeostasis, ICOS signaling has aroused great attention in immunodiagnosis and therapy.

The ICOS/ICOSLG axis has been shown to promote either antitumor T cell responses (when activated in Th1 and other Teff) or protumor responses when triggered in Tregs. Therefore, both agonistic and antagonistic monoclonal antibodies (mAbs) targeting this pathway are being investigated for cancer immunotherapy.

Undoubtedly, the development of more efficient and specific monoclonal antibodies may be important for further disclosure of ICOSLG function. Agonistic Abs are currently being administered either alone or in combination with immunotherapy and chemotherapy.

References list

Further reading

External links 
 

Clusters of differentiation